An ulcer is a medical condition caused by a break in a bodily membrane.

Ulcer or ulceration may also refer to:
Ulcer (dermatology), a sore on the skin or a mucous membrane
Fear Factory or Ulceration, an American industrial metal band

See also
Ulcer index, a stock market risk measure or technical analysis indicator devised by Peter Martin in 1987